Luke–Acts is the composite work of the Gospel according to Luke and the Acts of the Apostles in the New Testament. Both of these books of the Bible are credited to Luke. They also describe the narrative of those who continued to spread Christianity, ministry of Jesus and the subsequent ministry of the apostles and the Apostolic Age.

Authorship 

Both the books of Luke and Acts are narratives written to a man named Theophilus. The book of Acts starts out with: "The former treatise have I made", probably referring to the Gospel of Luke. Scholars believe that they were written by the same person. Luke–Acts has sometimes been presented as a single book in published Bibles or New Testaments, for example, in The Original New Testament (1985) and The Books of the Bible (2007).

Luke is the longest of the four gospels and the longest book in the New Testament; together with Acts of the Apostles it makes up a two-volume work from the same author, called Luke–Acts. The cornerstone of Luke–Acts' theology is "salvation history", the author's understanding that God's purpose is seen in the way he has acted, and will continue to act, in history.

Composition and setting 
It divides the history of first-century Christianity into three stages, with the gospel making up the first two of these – the arrival among men of Jesus the Messiah, from his birth to the beginning of his earthly mission in the meeting with John the Baptist followed by his earthly ministry, Passion, death, and resurrection (concluding the gospel story per se). The gospel's sources are thought to be the Gospel of Mark (for the narrative of Christ's earthly life), the hypothetical sayings collection called the Q source (for his teachings), and a collection of material called the L (for Luke) source, which is found only in this gospel.

The work is Hellenized and written for a gentile audience possibly, in part, to counter a gnostic understanding of history. Marcion, a famous 2nd-century heretic, who used a modified form of Luke known as the Gospel of Marcion, did not use Acts, perhaps because he was unaware of it or intentionally excluded it from his biblical canon; Irenaeus, a proto-orthodox apologist, is the first to use and mention Acts, specifically against Marcionism.

Some scholars note that there are two versions of Luke–Acts with the longer version 10–20 percent longer than the shorter version. Scholars disagree on which came first.

See also 

 The Lost Chapter of the Acts of the Apostles

References

Bibliography
 
 Joseph B. Tyson, ''Marcion and Luke-Acts: A defining struggle, University of South Carolina Press, 2006, 

Acts of the Apostles
Christian terminology
Gospel of Luke
New Testament books
Marcionism